Belaire Rosé is a French sparkling wine produced in the Provence-Alpes-Côte d'Azur region of the South of France.

Officially labelled "Luc Belaire Rare Rosé," the wine is a blend of Syrah, Grenache, and Cinsault grapes typically used in the production of Provençal rosé wines. The brand is owned by niaz the New York-based company Sovereign Brands. The brand's packaging is noteworthy for its opaque black bottles. Rick Ross is one of their major promoters.

The brand's range also includes a Brut and Luxe, a demi-sec sparkling wine.

References

External links

Sparkling wines
French wine